Yoann Jaumel  (born ) is a French male volleyball player. He was part of the France men's national volleyball team at the 2014 FIVB Volleyball Men's World Championship in Poland, and 2015 FIVB Volleyball World League in Rio de Janeiro. He is currently playing for Nice Volley ball.

He received the Best Setter award at the 2013 - 2014 season of Ligue A, and 2015 Memorial of Hubert Jerzy Wagner.

He is the son of Yves Jaumel, a former French Volleyball Player.

References

External links 
 Profile at lnv.fr
 Profile at FIVB.org

1987 births
Living people
French men's volleyball players
Place of birth missing (living people)
Mediterranean Games bronze medalists for France
Mediterranean Games medalists in volleyball
Competitors at the 2013 Mediterranean Games